Silvana Lattmann (born 8 November 1918) is an Italian-Swiss poet and author.

Personal life and education
Silvania Abruzzese (later Lattmann), was born in Naples, Italy in 1918. Her parents were Alfonso and Alba (birth family name Scanferla) Abruzzese. Her father died when she was young and the family then moved to several cities including Sanremo, Rome, Milan and Genoa. She attended university in Rome and Genoa to study biology and natural sciences, graduating in July 1942.

In July 1942, she married Michele Sgarlata, a naval engineer stationed on the  operating in the Mediterranean that was torpedoed and sunk on 6 December 1942 killing almost all the crew, including her husband. In 1943 she gave birth to their son Massimo.

In 1954, she married Charles Lattmann, an academic at the Swiss Federal Polytechnic in Zurich. She became a Swiss citizen, and moved with him to St. Gallen in Switzerland. She lived in Zürich from 1993 although spent substantial time on the Italian island of Ischia in the early 2000s. In 2018, when she moved to a retirement home in Rüschlikon.

Career
She is known as a writer of poems and fiction but only started writing in the 1970s when she was in her 60s. She had previously worked in several areas, including in biological science research. She writes predominantly in Italian.

After the Second World War ended, she was employed as an assistant at the University of Milan and as a researcher at the Stazione Zoologica Anton Dohrn, a multidisciplinary biological research institute in Naples. Between 1948 and 1954 she taught in secondary schools in Bergamo, Milan and Rome.

Her first published works were poems in the anthology Almanacco dello Specchio in 1978 and then in 1980 Le storie di Ariano that contained more of her poems as well as literary studies. The critical success of Fessura (Crevice) in 1983, and mentorship by Pio Fontana, the Professor of Italian literature at the University of St. Gallen, led her to publish collections of poems regularly until the 1990s. Her narrative poems relate to events over several generation that resolve tragedies. The figure of an angel, as a guide, mystery and representation of love is a recurring image in her poems.

In the 1990s, Lattmann began to study Eastern philosophies, which changed the direction of her writing. This was first seen in Malâkut (Space of the Angels in Farsi) published in 1996. She retained the image of an angel in this work.

Publications
 Quindici poesie. In: Almanacco dello specchio. Mondadori, Milano 1978.
 Le storie di Ariano. Nuove edizioni Vallecchi, Firenze 1980.
 Fessura. Edizioni Casagrande, Bellinzona 1983.
 Assolo per tromba in fa maggiore. Edizioni Casagrande, Bellinzona 1985
 Il Viaggio. Edizioni Casagrande, Bellinzona 1987.
 Quarta serata. Poesie–Bloc Notes 17. 1988
 Su Rosa rosse rosa di Alida Airaghi. Bloc Notes, 1988.
 La vecchia signora e il Brünig-Bahn Landi. Verkehrshaus, Lucerna 1989.
 La favola del poeta, della principessa, della parola e del gerundio. Edizioni Casagrande, Bellinzona 1989.
 Malâkut. Vanni Scheiwiller, Milano 1996.
 Signa. Edizioni Florence Packaging, 1997. With Japanese calligraphy Irma Bamert.
 Deianira. Edizioni Casagrande, Bellinzona 1998.
 Tale un teatro per me. (Incisione di Samuele Gabai) Edizioni Pulcinoelefante, Osnago 1998.
 Incontri. (Grafica Alina Kalczynska, English translation by Sarah Thorne). Vanni Scheiwiller, Milano 1998.
 Da solstizio a equinozio. Interlinea edizioni, Novara 2001.
 Fuoco e memoria. Bertoncello 2002.
 Graugraugrau. Edizioni Pulcinoelefante, Osnago 2006.
 Le storie di Ariano. Edizioni Josef Weiss, Mendrisio 2008.
 Incustodite distanze. Interlinea edizioni, Novara 2008.
 Brunngasse 8. Interlinea edizioni, Novara 2010.
 Quando il sud s'incontra armoniosamente con il nord. Leggerti N. 20.
 La quadratura del cerchio. Edizioni Ulivo, Balerna 2014.
 Vita e viaggi di J.L. Burckhardt. Un incontro con l'Islam dell'Ottocento. Con illustrazioni d'epoca. Edizioni Interlinea, Novara, 2016.
 Nata il 1918, Edizioni Casagrande, Bellinzona 2018
 I colori della guerra, Interlinea edizioni 2019.

Awards
She has been awarded prizes by the Swiss Schiller Foundation:
1984: Schiller Prize for Fessura
1997: Schiller Prize for Malâkut

References

1918 births
Living people
Italian poets
Swiss centenarians
Swiss women poets
Swiss poets
Italian biologists
Women centenarians
Italian women poets
Italian emigrants to Switzerland